Herbert Muller (20 June 1914 – 12 April 1999) was a Belgian racing cyclist. He rode in the 1937 Tour de France.

References

1914 births
1999 deaths
Belgian male cyclists
Place of birth missing